A weather god or goddess, also frequently known as a storm god or goddess, is a deity in mythology associated with weather phenomena such as thunder, snow, lightning, rain, wind, storms, tornadoes, and hurricanes. Should they only be in charge of one feature of a storm, they will be called after that attribute, such as a rain god or a lightning/thunder god. This singular attribute might then be emphasized more than the generic, all-encompassing term "storm god", though with thunder/lightning gods, the two terms seem interchangeable. They feature commonly in polytheistic religions, especially in Proto-Indo-European ones.

Storm gods are most often conceived of as wielding thunder and/or lightning (some lightning gods' names actually mean "thunder", but since one cannot have thunder without lightning, they presumably wielded both). The ancients didn't seem to differentiate between the two, which is presumably why both the words "lightning bolt" and "thunderbolt" exist despite being synonyms. Of the examples currently listed storm themed deities are more frequently depicted as male, but both male and female storm or other rain, wind, or weather deities are described.

Africa and the Middle East

Sub-Sahara Africa 
 Umvelinqangi, god of thunder, Zulu mythology
 Mbaba Mwana Waresa, goddess of rain, Zulu mythology
 Oya, the Yoruba orisha of winds, tempests, and cyclones
 Bunzi, goddess of rain, in Kongo mythology.

Afroasiatic Middle East

Canaanite 
 Ba'al, Canaanite god of fertility, weather, and war.
 Hadad, the Canaanite and Carthaginian storm, fertility, & war god. Identified as Baʿal's true name at Ugarit.

Egyptian 
 Horus, the Egyptian god of rainstorms, the weather, the sky and war. Associated with the sun, kingship, and retribution. Personified in the pharaoh.
 Set, the Egyptian chaos, evil, and storm god, lord of the desert.

Mesopotamian 
 Enlil, god associated with wind, air, earth, and storms
 Adad, the Mesopotamian weather god
 Manzat, goddess of the rainbow
 Shala, wife of Adad and a rain goddess
 Wer, a weather god worshiped in northern Mesopotamia and in Syria

Western Eurasia

Balto-Slavic 
 Audra, Lithuanian god of storms
 Bangpūtys, Lithuanian god of storms and the sea
 Perkūnas, Baltic god of thunder, rain, mountains, and oak trees. Servant of the creator god Dievas.
 Perun, Slavic god of thunder and lightning and king of the gods

Celtic 
 Taranis, Celtic god of thunder, often depicted with a wheel as well as a thunderbolt

Norse-Germanic 
 Freyr, Norse god of agriculture, medicine, fertility, sunshine, summer, abundance, and rain
 Thor, Norse god of thunder/lightning, oak trees, protection, strength, and hallowing. Also Thunor and Donar, the Anglo-Saxon and Continental Germanic versions, respectively, of him. All descend from Common Germanic *Thunraz, the reflex of the PIE thunder god for this language branch of the Indo-Europeans.

Greco-Roman 
 Aeolus (son of Hippotes), keeper of the winds in the Odyssey
 Anemoi, collective name for the gods of the winds in Greek mythology, their number varies from 4 to more
 Jupiter, the Roman weather and sky god and king of the gods
 Tempestas, Roman goddess of storms or sudden weather. Commonly referred to in the plural, Tempestates.
 Zeus, Greek weather and sky god and king of the gods

Western Asia

Anatolian-Caucasian 
 Tamar (goddess), Georgian virgin goddess who controlled the weather.
 Tarḫunna, Hittite storm god; other Anatolian languages had similar names for their storm gods, such as Luwian below.
 Tarḫunz, Luwian storm god.
 Teshub, Hurrian storm god.
 Theispas or Teisheba, the Urartian storm and war god.
 Vayu, Hindu/Vedic wind god.
 Weather god of Nerik, Hittite god of the weather worshiped in the village of Nerik.
 Weather god of Zippalanda, Hittite god of the weather worshiped in the village of Zippalanda.

Hindu-Vedic 
 Indra, Hindu God of the Weather, Storms, Sky, Lightning, and Thunder. Also known as the King of gods.
 Mariamman, Hindu rain goddess.
 Rudra, the god of wind, storms, and hunting; destructive aspect of Shiva

Persian-Zoroastrian 
 Vayu-Vata, Iranian duo of gods, the first is the god of wind, much like the Hindu Vayu.

Uralic 
 Küdryrchö Jumo, the Mari storm god.
 Ukko, Finnish thunder and harvest god and king of the gods

Asia-Pacific / Oceania

Chinese 

 Dian Mu, Leigong, and Wen Zhong, the thunder deities.
 Feng Bo, Feng Po Po, and Han Zixian, the Deities of Wind.
 Yunzhongzi, the master of clouds.
 Yu Shi, the god of rain.
 Sometimes the Dragon Kings were included instead of Yu Shi

Filipino 
 Oden, the Bugkalot deity of the rain, worshiped for the deity's life-giving waters
 Apo Tudo, the Ilocano deity of the rain
 Anitun Tauo, the Sambal goddess of wind and rain who was reduced in rank by Malayari for her conceit
 Anitun Tabu, the Tagalog goddess of wind and rain and daughter of Idianale and Dumangan
 Bulan-hari, one of the Tagalog deities sent by Bathala to aid the people of Pinak; can command rain to fall; married to Bitu-in
 Santonilyo, a Bisaya deity who brings rain when its image is immersed at sea
 Diwata Kat Sidpan, a Tagbanwa deity who lives in the western region called Sidpan; controls the rains
 Diwata Kat Libatan, a Tagbanwa deity who lives in the eastern region called Babatan; controls the rain
 Diwata na Magbabaya, simply referred as Magbabaya, the good Bukidnon supreme deity and supreme planner who looks like a man; created the earth and the first eight elements, namely bronze, gold, coins, rock, clouds, rain, iron, and water; using the elements, he also created the sea, sky, moon, and stars; also known as the pure god who wills all things; one of three deities living in the realm called Banting
 Anit: also called Anitan; the Manobo guardian of the thunderbolt
 Inaiyau: the Manobo god of storms
 Tagbanua: the Manobo god of rain
 Umouiri: the Manobo god of clouds
 Libtakan: the Manobo god of sunrise, sunset, and good weather

Japanese 

 Fūjin, Japanese wind god.
 Raijin, Japanese god of thunder, lightning, and storms
 Susanoo, tempestuous Japanese god of storms and the sea.

Vietnamese 
 Thần Gió, Vietnamese wind god.

Oceania 

 Baiame, sky god and creator deity of southeastern Australia.
 Julunggul, Arnhem Land rainbow serpent goddess who oversaw the initiation of boys into manhood.
 Tāwhirimātea, Maori storm god.

Native Americas

Central America and the Caribbean 
 Chaac, Maya rain god. Aztec equivalent is Tlaloc.
 Coatrisquie, Taíno rain goddess, servant of Guabancex, and sidekick of thunder god Guatauva.
 Cocijo, Zapotec god of lightning.
 Ehecatl, Aztec god of wind.
 Guabancex, top Taíno storm goddess; the Lady of the Winds who also dishes out earthquakes and other natural disasters.
 Guatauva, Taíno god of thunder and lightning who is also responsible for rallying the other storm gods.
 Huracán, K'iche Maya god of the weather, wind, storms, and fire.
 Juracán, Taíno zemi or deity of chaos and disorder believed to control the weather, particularly hurricanes
 K'awiil, classic Maya god of lightning.
 Q'uq'umatz, K'iche Maya god of wind and rain, also known as Kukulkan, Aztec equivalent is Quetzalcoatl
 Tezcatlipoca, Aztec god of hurricanes and night winds.
 Tlaloc, Aztec rain and earthquake god. Mayan equivalent is Chaac.
 Tohil, K'iche Maya god of rain, sun, and fire.
 Tupã, the Guaraní god of thunder and light. Creator of the universe.
 Yopaat, a Classic-period Maya storm god.

See also
 Rain god
 Sea god, often responsible for weather at sea
 Sky god
 Thunder god
 Wind god

References

Further reading 
 Holtom, D. C. "The Storm God Theme in Japanese Mythology." Sociologus, Neue Folge / New Series, 6, no. 1 (1956): 44-56. https://www.jstor.org/stable/43643852.

Lists of deities